Levente Lantos (born 26 July 1980) is a Hungarian former football player.

Club statistics

Updated to games played as of 28 November 2014.

References
Profile at HLSZ

1980 births
Living people
Sportspeople from Pécs
Hungarian footballers
Association football midfielders
Pécsi MFC players
Komlói Bányász SK footballers
Kozármisleny SE footballers
Nemzeti Bajnokság I players
Nemzeti Bajnokság II players
Nemzeti Bajnokság III players
21st-century Hungarian people